Dry Fork is a stream in Warren County in the U.S. state of Missouri. It is a tributary of Charrette Creek. A variant name is "Little Charrette Creek".

Dry Fork was named for its usually dry condition.

See also
List of rivers of Missouri

References

Rivers of Warren County, Missouri
Rivers of Missouri